The local government areas (LGAs) of New South Wales, Australia are the defined areas within which legally constituted local government authorities, known as councils, have responsibilities to provide local services. Determining the size and shape of the local government areas is the sole responsibility of the Government of New South Wales.

In the past, many local government areas have been amalgamated or abolished, either voluntarily or involuntarily. Major changes occurred as a result of the enactment of the Local Government (Areas) Act 1948 and as a result of a review by the NSW Independent Pricing and Regulatory Tribunal (IPART) that commenced in 2013. The IPART proposed a series of council mergers and amalgamation in both metropolitan and regional areas which proposed a reduction in the number of councils from 152 to 112. On 12 May 2016, following a further review by the Minister for Local Government and the independent Local Government Boundaries Commission, Premier Mike Baird announced Stage 1 starting with 19 new councils, through amalgamations and mergers, with immediate effect. The Minister indicated in principle support to create a further nine new councils, subject to the decision of the courts. On the same day, the Governor of New South Wales acted on the advice of the Minister, and proclaimed the 19 new local government areas. Another proclamation occurred a few months later with the amalgamation of City of Botany Bay and City of Rockdale.

List of former local government areas in New South Wales

Greater Sydney

Metropolitan councils

Sydney surrounds

Central Coast

Hunter

Illawarra/South Coast

Regional councils

See also

 Local government areas of New South Wales
 List of all local government areas in New South Wales

References